EyeToy: Operation Spy (also known as SpyToy in PAL regions) is a PlayStation 2 game which uses the EyeToy camera peripheral to detect player movements. The main objective of the game is to guard a room from an intruder. Unique features include new face recognition technology, new video messaging, and interactive missions. If an intruder is caught, the next time the player returns to the room they can watch the recorded video of who came in. The idea for EyeToy: Operation Spy came from the game EyeToy: Play 2 which also had similar security features.

Reception

The game received "mixed" reviews according to the review aggregation website Metacritic.

References

External links
 

2005 video games
EyeToy games
London Studio games
PlayStation 2 games
PlayStation 2-only games
Single-player video games
Sony Interactive Entertainment games
Spy video games
Video games developed in the United Kingdom